Sheldon Taylor Rankins (born April 2, 1994) is an American football defensive tackle for the Houston Texans of the National Football League (NFL). He played college football at Louisville. He was drafted in the first round (12th overall) by the New Orleans Saints in the 2016 NFL Draft, and played for the team from 2016 to 2020.

Early years
Rankins attended Eastside High School in Covington, Georgia. He committed to the University of Louisville to play college football.

College career
At Louisville, Rankins was mostly a backup during his freshman and sophomore years, recording 22 tackles and four sacks. As a junior, in 2014, Rankins started in all 13 games and had 53 tackles, eight sacks, and two interceptions. As a senior, in 2015, he had 58 tackles, six sacks, and a fumble return touchdown.

Professional career

New Orleans Saints
On April 28, 2016, Rankins was drafted as the 12th overall pick by the New Orleans Saints in the first round of the 2016 NFL Draft. On May 9, 2016, the Saints signed Rankins to a four-year, 12.8 million dollar contract.

2016
On August 16, 2016, Rankins suffered a broken fibula during practice. The injury required surgery with up to 6 weeks to recover. On September 6, 2016, he was placed on injured/designated for return list. He was activated off injured reserve on November 5, 2016 prior to Week 9. During his rookie year, he played 9 games and finished with 20 tackles, four sacks, and a forced fumble.

2017
During his second season, Rankins started all 16 regular season games to help a scoring defense go from 31st in the NFL to tenth in the league. Rankins recorded 16 solo tackles (26 total), one forced fumble, one interception, and one pass defensed.

2018
In 2018, Rankins started all 16 games, recorded 40 tackles and eight sacks, which was second best on the team behind Cameron Jordan. In the divisional round of the playoffs, against the Philadelphia Eagles, Rankins suffered a torn Achilles and was placed on injured reserve on January 15, 2019.

2019
On April 24, 2019, the Saints picked up the fifth-year option on Rankins' contract. He was placed on injured reserve on December 11, 2019 with an ankle injury. He finished the season with 10 tackles and two sacks through 10 games.

2020
On November 6, 2020, Rankins was placed on injured reserve with a knee injury. He was activated on December 5, 2020.

New York Jets
On March 23, 2021, Rankins signed a two-year, $17 million contract with the New York Jets.

Houston Texans
On March 18, 2023, Rankins signed a one-year, $10.5 million contract with the Houston Texans.

References

External links
New Orleans Saints bio
Louisville Cardinals bio

1994 births
Living people
People from Covington, Georgia
Sportspeople from the Atlanta metropolitan area
Players of American football from Georgia (U.S. state)
American football defensive tackles
American football defensive ends
Louisville Cardinals football players
New Orleans Saints players
New York Jets players
Houston Texans players
Ed Block Courage Award recipients